Seth Davis (born July 28, 1979) is an American author, drummer, and educator.

Seth is an active educator and performance artist in advanced drumming and has shared rosters with other percussion educators including, Chad Wackerman, Chris Coleman, Chip Ritter, Danny Seraphine, Derek Roddy, Dom Famularo, and Mike Mangini.

Drumming technique

Davis is known for exhibiting advanced technical drumming abilities as a performance artist through drum clinics, master classes and workshops, as well as online video demonstrations and tutorials via 100+ YouTube videos.

Highlighted skill sets include master hand technique, speed drumming, and writing complex vertical and horizontal hybrid compositions when arranging and composing music, drum solos, and rudimental drumming pieces. The Davis Method is his personalized hand and drum set technique and overall approach to drumming and percussion education and performance. Davis explains his drum method as a five-part, pronation and supination based technique, with a French timpani grip.

While Davis teaches drumming proficiency through physical training and practicing on and off the instrument, he accredits mental training as the secret for achieving and possibly exceeding one's personal drumming goals through the utilization of specific brain wave cycles, self-hypnosis, selective meditation, and creative visualization.

Career

Recording and touring
Seth was the drummer for Berklee College of Music based progressive rock band Abigail's Ghost from 2004 to 2006.

From 2007 to 2011, Seth performed as a session musician in the downtown area of New Orleans known as the French Quarter, performing an estimated 500+ shows with local artists on the Bourbon Street club circuit. While working in New Orleans, he met Kyle Thomas of the legendary metallers, Exhorder. He joined the New Orleans-based groove metal band in the spring of 2010, touring the U.S. and headlining metal festivals  through winter of 2011 performing hits from the band's two seminal albums - Slaughter in the Vatican and The Law. Chris Nail, the original drummer, wrote and recorded all drum arrangements for the two studio albums.

In 2016, Davis arranged and released his first instrumental studio album through Seth Davis Drumming, titled The Darkling Throng. This is the first album in a music series he created called M.U.S.I.C. – a tribute to modern-day composers inspired by the late Neil Peart’s catchphrase "Make-up something interesting and complimentary". The recording features various composers with stylistic influences ranging from art rock, djent, and industrial music to progressive rock, progressive metal, and symphonic metal music genres.

Rankings and records

Seth Davis became ranked as one of the top 10 fastest drummers in the world  during the 2002 Warped Tour, certified by the World's Fastest Drummers Org. After being welcomed into what WFD champions refer to as "The Thousand Club", their elite club for speed drummers by playing 1000+ single strokes in 60 seconds, he continued to break his initial single stroke speed ranking. He went on to set 3 world speed records for the double stroke roll  from 2002 to 2004, establishing himself as a world-recognized speed champion. "Seth was the first person in history to officially play a clean, open, double stroke roll over the 1000, 1100, and 1200 strokes per minute mark. Through permission from the WFD, Davis created the double stroke category to teach how to play a clean, open roll, as well as perform various accuracy demonstrations with rudiments from multiple sticking families. Davis was ineligible to compete in any NAMM WFD finals for single strokes because of becoming a world champion first." He co-hosted the WFD competitions from 2005 to 2006  with fellow speed champion Mike Mangini at the Nashville, Los Angeles, and Indianapolis NAMM Show.

Seth's official hand speed rankings and records:

 Single Stroke Roll: 1005, 1024, and 1044 strokes in 60 seconds (2002) 
 Double Stroke Roll: 1021, 1084, and 1200 strokes in 60 seconds (2003 - 2004) 

He states his top speed for the single stroke roll is 17 1/2 to 18 strokes per second when applied to the drum set as a rhythmic phrasing and 20 strokes per second for the double stroke roll. He accredits fellow world speed champions through social media video posts as the World's Fastest Drummer Champions who are able to reach and exceed 20 strokes per second while playing a single stroke roll. In 2012, Davis trained a late-blooming 50+-year-old drummer named Nick Stefano to compete in the WFD. Through Davis' instruction, Nick placed third in official competition, playing 948 single strokes with an unofficial score of 1022. Both scores were recorded using the traditional grip. Following a 10-year hiatus from the WFD, Davis reemerged at the 2016 summer NAMM show in Nashville, Tennessee, giving an exclusive interview about his experience in the organization, including an introductory speech at the world finals.

While Seth focuses more on music composition these days, highlighting diverse drumming skill-sets, he is acknowledged and respected as one of the pioneers of the elite speed drumming movement.

Retirement
Seth announced his retirement from drumming in December 2016 due to non-drumming related physical injuries.

On September 13, 2017, he announced that he had started training and practicing again.

Current
In addition to weekly drum video releases, Davis collaborates with composers worldwide; releasing music video snippets based on his book Revolutionizing Rhythm.

The series is titled M.U.S.I.C. — “Make up something interesting and complimentary.”

Philanthropy
Seth Davis was one of seven celebrity drummers featured at the ninth annual Woodstick Big Beat in Kirkland, Washington in 2011. The proceeds from the World Record Drum Event went to for purchasing musical instruments for underfunded local schools and to Camp Korey, a camp in Mount Vernon, Washington to help assist and aid kids battling serious illnesses.

Endorsements
 Drumsticks: London Drumstick Company  - (2019)
 Drumheads: Attack Drumheads  - (2020)
 Cymbals: Paiste  - Paiste Artist Since January 2022
 Practice Pads: Prologix  - (May 2022)

Books & Videos
 Revolutionizing Rhythm (2021)
 VDTs - Video Drum Transcriptions (2021)

“I am happy to announce the release of my book. It is an honor and a privilege to be included in the Hudson catalog of artists, an archive which includes some of the finest drummers in the world; many of which are my greatest inspirations. Special thanks to Joe Bergamini. Revolutionizing Rhythm Project: 2014-2021.” -SD (Digital and Hardcover versions available)

Revolutionizing Rhythm is an avant-garde study guide to the art of advanced drumming, philosophy, personal development, and life achievement and success.

Discography
 Abigail's Ghost: Selling Insincerity (2007)
 Seth Davis Drumming: The Darkling Throng (2016)

See also
List of notable drummers

References

External links
 Official website
 Official YouTube

American writers
Progressive rock musicians
American heavy metal drummers
American heavy metal musicians
Progressive metal musicians
1979 births
Living people
20th-century American drummers
American male drummers
21st-century American drummers
20th-century American male musicians
21st-century American male musicians